Port Pipavav, India's first port in the private sector, is a port on the West Coast of India for containers, bulk and liquid cargo. Its lead promoter is APM Terminals, one of the largest container terminal operators in the world. The services include pilotage/towage, cargo handling and logistics support.  Port Pipavav is located in Rajula Saurashtra, Gujarat, at a distance of 90 km South of Amreli, 15 km South of Rajula  and 140 km South West of Bhavnagar. The port handles both bulk, container and liquid cargo.

History 
In 1998, concession was awarded to Gujarat Pipavav Port Limited by Gujarat Maritime Board. In 2000, the port formed a joint venture with Indian Railways to start Pipavav Rail Corporation Limited. Commercial operations started in 2002.

In 2005 APM Terminals acquired majority stake. Major projects were completed in 2009 and the company came out with an IPO and was listed on Indian Stock Exchange in 2010.

Shialbet Island 
The port has a natural breakwater facing the wharves called Shialbet Island. The Island is inhabited by a small fishing community and is connected to the mainland.

Characteristics 
The port is along the major trade routes and is close to the major Indian Port of Nhava Sheva (about 160 Nm). It has been dredged to 14.5 m draft. There are 8 Quay cranes for containers and 2 mobile harbor cranes for handling bulk cargo. It is a captive reefer port.

External links 
 Official site of APM Terminals Pipavav [GPPL
 Official site of APM Terminals

References 

Buildings and structures in Gujarat
Ports and harbours of Gujarat
Companies listed on the National Stock Exchange of India
Companies listed on the Bombay Stock Exchange